Ihar Andreyevich Kuzmyanok (born 6 July 1990) is a Belarusian professional footballer who plays for Gomel.

International career
He competed for Belarus at the 2012 Summer Olympics.

Honours
Gomel
Belarusian Cup winner: 2010–11, 2021–22
Belarusian Super Cup winner: 2012

Shakhtyor Soligorsk
Belarusian Cup winner: 2013–14, 2018–19

References

External links

1990 births
Living people
People from Zhlobin District
Sportspeople from Gomel Region
Belarusian footballers
Association football defenders
Olympic footballers of Belarus
Footballers at the 2012 Summer Olympics
FC Gomel players
FC Dinamo Minsk players
FC Shakhtyor Soligorsk players
FC Torpedo-BelAZ Zhodino players
FC Isloch Minsk Raion players